Slovene ( or ), or alternatively Slovenian (or ), is a South Slavic language, a sub-branch that is part of the Balto-Slavic branch of the Indo-European language family. It is spoken by about 2.5 million speakers worldwide (excluding speakers of Kajkavian), mainly ethnic Slovenes, the majority of whom live in Slovenia, where it is the sole official language. As Slovenia is part of the European Union, Slovene is also one of its 24 official and working languages.

Standard Slovene

Standard Slovene is the national standard language that was formed in the 18th and 19th century, based on Upper and Lower Carniolan dialect groups, more specifically on language of Ljubljana and its adjacent areas. The Lower Carniolan dialect group was the dialect used in the 16th century by Primož Trubar for his writings, while he also used Slovene as spoken in Ljubljana, since he lived in the city for more than 20 years. It was the speech of Ljubljana that Trubar took as a foundation of what later became standard Slovene, with small addition of his native speech, that is Lower Carniolan dialect Trubar's choice was later adopted also by other Protestant writers in the 16th century, and ultimately led to the formation of more standard language. The Upper dialect was also used by most authors during the language revival in the 18th and early 19th centuries, and was also the language spoken by France Prešeren, who, like most of Slovene writers and poets, lived and worked in Ljubljana, where speech was growing closer to the Upper Carniolan dialect group. Unstandardized dialects are more preserved in regions of the Slovene Lands where compulsory schooling was in languages other than Standard Slovene, as was the case with the Carinthian Slovenes in Austria, and the Slovene minority in Italy. For example, the Resian and Torre (Ter) dialects in the Italian Province of Udine differ most from other Slovene dialects.

The distinctive characteristics of Slovene are dual grammatical number, two accentual norms (one characterized by pitch accent), and abundant inflection (a trait shared with many Slavic languages). Although Slovene is basically an SVO language, word order is very flexible, often adjusted for emphasis or stylistic reasons. Slovene has a T–V distinction: second-person plural forms are used for individuals as a sign of respect.

Classification
Slovene is an Indo-European language belonging to the Western subgroup of the South Slavic branch of the Slavic languages, together with Serbo-Croatian. It is close to the Chakavian and especially Kajkavian dialects of Serbo-Croatian, but further from the Shtokavian dialect, the basis for the Bosnian, Croatian, Montenegrin, and Serbian standard languages. Furthermore, Slovene shares certain linguistic characteristics with all South Slavic languages, including those of the Eastern subgroup, such as Bulgarian.

Mutual intelligibility with varieties of Serbo-Croatian is hindered by differences in vocabulary, grammar, and pronunciation, Kajkavian being the most mutually intelligible. Slovene has some commonalities with the West Slavic languages.

History

Early history

Like all Slavic languages, Slovene traces its roots to the same proto-Slavic group of languages that produced Old Church Slavonic. The earliest known examples of a distinct, written dialect connected to Slovene are from the Freising manuscripts, known in Slovene as Brižinski spomeniki. The consensus estimate of their date of origin is between 972 and 1039 (most likely before 1000). These religious writings are among the oldest surviving manuscripts in any Slavic language.

The Freising manuscripts are a record of a proto-Slovene that was spoken in a more scattered territory than modern Slovene, which included most of the present-day Austrian states of Carinthia and Styria, as well as East Tyrol, the Val Pusteria in South Tyrol, and some areas of Upper and Lower Austria.

By the 15th century, most of the northern areas were gradually Germanized: the northern border of the Slovene-speaking territory stabilized on the line going from north of Klagenfurt to south of Villach and east of Hermagor in Carinthia, while in Styria it was pretty much identical with the current Austrian-Slovenian border.

This linguistic border remained almost unchanged until the late 19th century, when a second process of Germanization took place, mostly in Carinthia. Between the 9th and 12th century, proto-Slovene spread into northern Istria and in the areas around Trieste.

During most of the Middle Ages, Slovene was a vernacular language of the peasantry, although it was also spoken in most of the towns on Slovenian territory, together with German or Italian. Although during this time, German emerged as the spoken language of the nobility, Slovene had some role in the courtly life of the Carinthian, Carniolan and Styrian nobility, as well. This is proved by the survival of certain ritual formulas in Slovene (such as the ritual installation of the Dukes of Carinthia). The words "Buge waz primi, gralva Venus!" ("God be With You, Queen Venus!"), with which Bernhard von Spanheim greeted the poet Ulrich von Liechtenstein, who was travelling around Europe in guise of Venus, upon his arrival in Carinthia in 1227 (or 1238), is another example of some level of Slovene knowledge among high nobility in the region.

The first printed Slovene words, stara pravda (meaning 'old justice' or 'old laws'), appeared in 1515 in Vienna in a poem of the German mercenaries who suppressed the Slovene peasant revolt: the term was presented as the peasants' motto and battle cry. Standard Slovene emerged in the second half of the 16th century, thanks to the works of Slovene Lutheran authors, who were active during the Protestant Reformation. The most prominent authors from this period are Primož Trubar, who wrote the first books in Slovene; Adam Bohorič, the author of the first Slovene grammar; and Jurij Dalmatin, who translated the entire Bible into Slovene.

From the high Middle Ages up to the dissolution of the Austro-Hungarian Empire in 1918, in the territory of present-day Slovenia, German was the language of the elite, and Slovene was the language of the common people. During this period, German had a strong influence on Slovene, and many Germanisms are preserved in contemporary colloquial Slovene. Many Slovene scientists before the 1920s also wrote in foreign languages, mostly German, which was the lingua franca of science throughout Central Europe at the time.

Recent history
During the rise of Romantic nationalism in the 19th century, the cultural movements of Illyrism and Pan-Slavism brought words from Serbo-Croatian, specifically Croatian dialects, and Czech into standard Slovene, mostly to replace words previously borrowed from German. Most of these innovations have remained, although some were dropped in later development. In the second half of the 19th century, many nationalist authors made an abundant use of Serbo-Croatian words: among them were Fran Levstik and Josip Jurčič, who wrote the first novel in Slovene in 1866. This tendency was reversed in the Fin de siècle period by the first generation of modernist Slovene authors (most notably the writer Ivan Cankar), who resorted to a more "pure" and simple language without excessive Serbo-Croatian borrowings.

During the Kingdom of Yugoslavia in the 1920s and 1930s, the influence of Serbo-Croatian increased again. This was opposed by the younger generations of Slovene authors and intellectuals; among the most fierce opponents of an excessive Serbo-Croatian influence on Slovene were the intellectuals associated with the leftist journal Sodobnost, as well as some younger Catholic activists and authors. After 1945, numerous Serbo-Croatian words that had been used in the previous decades were dropped. The result was that a Slovene text from the 1910s is frequently closer to modern Slovene than a text from the 1920s and 1930s.

Between 1920 and 1941, the official language of the Kingdom of Yugoslavia was defined as "Serbo-Croato-Slovene", which was in practice merely Serbo-Croatian. In Slovenia however, Slovene remained in use in education and administration. Many state institutions used only Serbo-Croatian, and a Slovene–Serbo-Croatian bilingualism was applied in many spheres of public life in Slovenia. For examples, at the post offices, railways and in administrative offices, Serbo-Croatian was used alongside Slovene. However, state employees were expected to be able to speak Slovene in Slovenia.

During the same time, western Slovenia (the Slovenian Littoral and the western districts of Inner Carniola) was under Italian administration and submitted to a violent policy of Fascist Italianization; the same policy was applied to Slovene speakers in Venetian Slovenia, Gorizia and Trieste. Between 1923 and 1943, all public use of Slovene in these territories was strictly prohibited, and Slovene-language activists were persecuted by the state.

After the Carinthian Plebiscite of 1920, a less severe policy of Germanization took place in the Slovene-speaking areas of southern Carinthia which remained under Austrian administration. After the Anschluss of 1938, the use of Slovene was strictly forbidden in Carinthia, as well. This accelerated a process of language shift in Carinthia, which continued throughout the second half of the 20th century: according to the Austro-Hungarian census of 1910, around 21% of inhabitants of Carinthia spoke Slovene in their daily communication; by 1951, this figure dropped to less than 10%, and by 2001 to a mere 2.8%.

During World War II, Slovenia was divided among the Axis Powers of Fascist Italy, Nazi Germany, and Hungary. Each of the occupying powers tried to either discourage or entirely suppress Slovene.

Following World War II, Slovenia became part of the Socialist Federal Republic of Yugoslavia. Slovene was one of the official languages of the federation. In the territory of Slovenia, it was commonly used in almost all areas of public life. One important exception was the Yugoslav army, where Serbo-Croatian was used exclusively, even in Slovenia.

National independence has further fortified the language: since 1991, when Slovenia gained independence, Slovene has been used as an official language in all areas of public life. In 2004 it became one of the official languages of the European Union upon Slovenia's admission.

Nonetheless, post-breakup influence of Serbo-Croatian onto Slovene continued to a lesser extent, most prominently in slang in colloquial language.

Joža Mahnič, a literary historian and president of the publishing house Slovenska matica, said in February 2008 that Slovene is a language rich enough to express everything, including the most sophisticated and specialised texts. In February 2010, Janez Dular, a prominent Slovene linguist, commented that, although Slovene is not an endangered language, its scope has been shrinking, especially in science and higher education.

Geographic distribution 
The language is spoken by about 2.5 million people, mainly in Slovenia, but also by Slovene national minorities in Friuli-Venezia Giulia, Italy (around 90,000 in Venetian Slovenia, Resia Valley, Canale Valley, Province of Trieste and in those municipalities of the Province of Gorizia bordering with Slovenia), in southern Carinthia, some parts of Styria in Austria (25,000) and in west part Croatian Istria bordering with Slovenia. It is also spoken in Rijeka and Zagreb (11,800-13,100), in southwestern Hungary (3-5,000), in Serbia (5,000), and by the Slovene diaspora throughout Europe and the rest of the world (around 300,000), particularly in the United States (most notably Ohio, home to an estimated 3,400 speakers), Canada, Argentina, Australia and South Africa.

Dialects

Slovene is sometimes characterized as the most diverse Slavic language in terms of dialects, with different degrees of mutual intelligibility. Accounts of the number of dialects range from as few as seven dialects, often considered dialect groups or dialect bases that are further subdivided into as many as 50 dialects. Other sources characterize the number of dialects as nine or eight. The Slovene proverb "Every village has its own voice" (Vsaka vas ima svoj glas) depicts the differences in dialects. Although pronunciation differs greatly from area to area, those differences do not pose major obstacles to understanding. The standard language is mainly used in public presentations or on formal occasions.

The Prekmurje dialect used to have a written norm of its own at one point. The Resian dialects have an independent written norm that is used by their regional state institutions. Speakers of those two dialects have considerable difficulties with being understood by speakers of other varieties of Slovene, needing code-switching to Standard Slovene. Other dialects are mutually intelligible when speakers avoid the excessive usage of regionalisms.

Regionalisms are mostly limited to culinary and agricultural expressions, although there are many exceptions. Some loanwords have become so deeply rooted in the local language that people have considerable difficulties in finding a standard expression for the dialect term (for instance, kovter meaning blanket is prešita odeja in Standard Slovene, but the latter term is very rarely used in speech, being considered inappropriate for non-literary registers). Southwestern dialects incorporate a great deal of calques and loanwords from Italian, whereas eastern and northwestern dialects are replete with lexemes of German origin. Usage of such words hinders intelligibility between dialects and is greatly discouraged in formal situations.

Phonology

Slovene has a phoneme set consisting of 21 consonants and 8 vowels.

Consonants 
Slovene has 21 distinctive consonant phonemes.

All voiced obstruents are devoiced at the end of words unless immediately followed by a word beginning with a vowel or a voiced consonant. In consonant clusters, voicing distinction is neutralized and all consonants assimilate the voicing of the rightmost segment, i.e. the final consonant in the cluster.

 has several allophones depending on context.
 Before a vowel, pronunciation is labiodental,  (also described as ).
 After a vowel, pronunciation is bilabial  and forms a diphthong.
 At the beginning of a syllable, before a consonant (for example in vsi "all"), the pronunciation varies more widely by speaker and area. Many speakers convert  into a full vowel  in this position. For those speakers who retain a consonantal pronunciation, it is pronounced  before a voiced consonant and  before a voiceless consonant. Thus, vsi may be pronounced as disyllabic  or monosyllabic .

The sequences ,  and  occur only before a vowel.

Vowels 

Slovene has an eight-vowel (or, according to Peter Jurgec, nine-vowel) system, in comparison to the five-vowel system of Serbo-Croatian.

Grammar

Nouns

Slovene nouns retain six of the seven Slavic noun cases: nominative, accusative, genitive, dative, locative and instrumental. There is no distinct vocative; the nominative is used in that role. Nouns, adjectives and pronouns have three numbers: singular, dual and plural.

Nouns in Slovene are either masculine, feminine or neuter gender. In addition, there is a distinction between animate and inanimate nouns. This is only relevant for masculine nouns and only in the singular, at odds with some other Slavic languages, e.g. Russian, for which it is also relevant in the plural for all genders. Animate nouns have an accusative singular form that is identical to the genitive, while for inanimate nouns the accusative singular is the same as the nominative. Animacy is based mostly on semantics and is less rigid than gender. Generally speaking a noun is animate if it refers to something that is generally thought to have free will or the ability to move of its own accord. This includes all nouns for people and animals. All other nouns are inanimate, including plants and other non-moving life forms, and also groups of people or animals. However, there are some nouns for inanimate objects that are generally animate, which mostly include inanimate objects that are named after people or animals. This includes:
 Dead people or animals
 Makes of cars
 Certain diseases (named after animals)
 Certain devices (named after animals or people)
 Works of art (named after their creator)
 Chess pieces and playing cards (named for the people they represent)
 Wines and mushrooms (named as demonyms)

Definiteness
There are no definite or indefinite articles as in English (a, an, the) or German (der, die, das, ein, eine). A whole verb or a noun is described without articles and the grammatical gender is found from the word's termination. It is enough to say barka ('a' or 'the barge'), Noetova barka ('Noah's ark'). The gender is known in this case to be feminine. In declensions, endings are normally changed; see below. If one should like to somehow distinguish between definiteness or indefiniteness of a noun, one would say (prav/natanko/ravno) tista barka ('that/precise/exact barge') for 'the barge' and neka/ena barka ('some/a barge') for 'a barge'.

Definiteness of a noun phrase can also be discernible through the ending of the accompanying adjective. One should say rdeči šotor ('[exactly that] red tent') or rdeč šotor ('[a] red tent'). This difference is observable only for masculine nouns in nominative or accusative case. Because of the lack of article in Slovene and audibly insignificant difference between the masculine adjective forms, most dialects do not distinguish between definite and indefinite variants of the adjective, leading to hypercorrection when speakers try to use Standard Slovene.

T–V distinction

Slovene, like most other European languages, has a T–V distinction, or two forms of 'you' for formal and informal situations. Although informal address using the 2nd person singular ti form (known as tikanje) is officially limited to friends and family, talk among children, and addressing animals, it is increasingly used among the middle generation to signal a relaxed attitude or lifestyle instead of its polite or formal counterpart using the 2nd person plural vi form (known as vikanje).

An additional nonstandard but widespread use of a singular participle combined with a plural auxiliary verb (known as polvikanje) signals a somewhat more friendly and less formal attitude while maintaining politeness:

 Vi ga niste videli. ('You did not see him': both the auxiliary verb niste and the participle videli are plural masculine. Standard usage.)
 Vi ga niste videl/videla. ('You did not see him': the auxiliary verb niste is plural but the participle videl/videla is singular masculine/feminine. Nonstandard usage.)

The use of nonstandard forms (polvikanje) might be frowned upon by many people and would not likely be used in a formal setting.

The use of the 3rd person plural oni ('they') form (known as onikanje in both direct address and indirect reference; this is similar to using Sie in German) as an ultra-polite form is now archaic or dialectal. It is associated with servant-master relationships in older literature, the child-parent relationship in certain conservative rural communities, and parishioner-priest relationships.

Vocabulary

Numbers

Foreign words
Foreign words used in Slovene are of various types depending on the assimilation they have undergone. The types are:
 sposojenka (loanword)fully assimilated; e.g. pica ('pizza').
 tujka (foreign word)partly assimilated, either in writing and syntax or in pronunciation; e.g. jazz, wiki.
 polcitatna beseda ali besedna zveza (half-quoted word or phrase) – partly assimilated, either in writing and syntax or in pronunciation; e.g. Shakespeare, but Shakespearja in genitive case.
 citatna beseda ali besedna zveza (quoted word or phrase)kept as in original, although pronunciation may be altered to fit into speech flow; e.g. first lady in all cases.
The loanwords are mostly from German and Italian, while the more recently borrowed and less assimilated words are typically from English.

Writing system 

This alphabet was derived in the mid-1840s from the system created by the Croatian linguist Ljudevit Gaj. Intended for the Serbo-Croatian language (in all its varieties), it was patterned on the Czech alphabet of the 1830s.

The orthography thus underdifferentiates several phonemic distinctions:

 Stress, vowel length and tone are not distinguished, except with optional diacritics when it is necessary to distinguish between similar words with a different meaning.
However, the combination  is written as simply  between consonants and is thus distinguishable.

The reader is expected to gather the interpretation of the word from the context, as in these examples:

 gol:
  gȍł "naked"
  gọ̑l "goal"
 jesen:
  jésen "ash tree"
  jesẹ̑n "autumn"
 kot
  kọ́t "angle"
  kot "as"
 med
  med "between"
  mẹ̑d "honey"
 pol
  pọ̑l "pole"
  pọ̑ł "half"
  pól "half an hour before (the hour)"
 precej
  prȅcej "at once" (archaic)
  precẹ̑j or  precȅj "a great deal (of)"

Diacritics

To compensate for the shortcomings of the standard orthography, Slovene also uses standardized diacritics or accent marks to denote stress, vowel length and pitch accent, much like the closely related Serbo-Croatian. However, as in Serbo-Croatian, use of such accent marks is restricted to dictionaries, language textbooks and linguistic publications. In normal writing, the diacritics are almost never used, except in a few minimal pairs where real ambiguity could arise.

Two different and mutually incompatible systems of diacritics are used. The first is the simpler non-tonemic system, which can be applied to all Slovene dialects. It is more widely used and is the standard representation in dictionaries such as SSKJ. The tonemic system also includes tone as part of the representation. However, neither system reliably distinguishes schwa  from the front mid-vowels, nor vocalised l  from regular l . Some sources write these as ə and ł, respectively, but this is not as common.

Non-tonemic diacritics
In the non-tonemic system, the distinction between the two mid-vowels is indicated, as well as the placement of stress and length of vowels:

 Long stressed vowels are notated with an acute diacritic: á é í ó ú ŕ.
 Short stressed vowels are notated with a grave: à è ì ò ù.

Tonemic diacritics
The tonemic system uses the diacritics somewhat differently from the non-tonemic system.

Pitch accent and length is indicated by four diacritical marks:

 The acute ( ´ ) indicates long and low pitch: á é ẹ́ í ó ọ́ ú ŕ.
 The inverted breve (  ̑ ) indicates long and high pitch: ȃ ȇ ẹ̑ ȋ ȏ ọ̑ ȗ ȓ.
 The grave ( ` ) indicates short and low pitch. This occurs only on è, optionally written as ə̀.

The schwa vowel  is written ambiguously as e, but its accentuation will sometimes distinguish it: a long vowel mark can never appear on a schwa, while a grave accent can appear only on a schwa. Thus, only ȅ and unstressed e are truly ambiguous.

Regulation
Standard Slovene spelling and grammar are defined by the Orthographic Committee and the Fran Ramovš Institute of the Slovene Language, which are both part of the Slovenian Academy of Sciences and Arts (Slovenska akademija znanosti in umetnosti, SAZU). The newest reference book of standard Slovene spelling (and to some extent also grammar) is the Slovenski pravopis (SP2001; Slovene Normative Guide). The latest printed edition was published in 2001 (reprinted in 2003 with some corrections) and contains more than 130,000 dictionary entries. In 2003, an electronic version was published.

The official dictionary of modern Slovene, which was also prepared by SAZU, is Slovar slovenskega knjižnega jezika (SSKJ; Standard Slovene Dictionary). It was published in five volumes by Državna Založba Slovenije between 1970 and 1991 and contains more than 100,000 entries and subentries with accentuation, part-of-speech labels, common collocations, and various qualifiers. In the 1990s, an electronic version of the dictionary was published and is available online.

The SAZU considers SP2001 to be the normative source on Slovene. When dictionary entries in SP2001 and SSKJ differ, the SP2001 entry takes precedence. SP2001 is called a Spelling Dictionary by the European Network of e-Lexicography.

Sample 
Below is the preamble of the Universal Declaration of Human Rights in Slovene.Ker priznanje prirojenega dostojanstva ter enakih in neodtujljivih pravic vseh članov človeške družine pomeni temelj svobode, pravičnosti in miru v svetu,

ker sta zanikanje in teptanje človekovih pravic pripeljala do barbarskih dejanj, ki so pretresla zavest človeštva, in ker je bila za najvišjo spoznana težnja človeštva, da bi nastopil svet, v katerem bodo ljudje uživali svobodo govora in prepričanja ter svobodo živeti brez strahu in pomanjkanja,

ker je nujno potrebno človekove pravice zavarovati z vladavino prava, da se človek v skrajni sili ne bi bil prisiljen zateči k uporu zoper tiranijo in zatiranje,

ker je nujno potrebno spodbujati razvoj prijateljskih odnosov med narodi,

ker so ljudstva Organizacije združenih narodov v Ustanovni listini potrdila svojo vero v temeljne človekove pravice, dostojanstvo in vrednost človeškega bitja ter v enake pravice moških in žensk ter se odločila, da bodo spodbujala družbeni napredek in boljše življenjske razmere v večji svobodi,

ker so se države članice zavezale, da bodo, v sodelovanju z Organizacijo združenih narodov, zagotavljale splošno spoštovanje in upoštevanje človekovih pravic in temeljnih svoboščin,

ker je skupno razumevanje  pravic in svoboščin največjega pomena za celovito uresničitev te zaveze,

Generalna skupščina

razglaša Splošno deklaracijo človekovih pravic kot skupen ideal vseh ljudstev in vseh narodov z namenom, da bi vsi posamezniki in vsi organi družbe, vselej ob upoštevanju te deklaracije, z vzgojo in izobraževanjem spodbujali spoštovanje  pravic in svoboščin ter s postopnimi državnimi in mednarodnimi ukrepi zagotovili njihovo splošno in dejansko priznanje in upoštevanje, tako med ljudstvi držav članic samih kakor tudi med ljudstvi ozemelj pod njihovo upravo.

References

Bibliography

External links

 Centre for Slovene as a Second/Foreign Language
 Slovenian Phonology

Grammars
 Slovene Grammar

Corpora
 Slovenian National Corpus 600 M words corpus of Slovenian FidaPLUS
 200 M words corpus of Slovenian Nova beseda

Dictionaries
  Standard Slovene Dictionary (SSKJ)
  Comprehensive list of the Slovene dictionaries
  Spletni Slovar (Multilingual Dictionary)

 
South Slavic languages
Languages of Slovenia
Languages of Austria
Languages of Serbia
Languages of Friuli-Venezia Giulia
Languages of Hungary
Languages of Italy
Slavic languages written in Latin script